The King of Paris (French: Le roi de Paris) is a 1923 French silent film directed by Maurice de Marsan and Charles Maudru and starring Jean Dax,  Suzanne Munte and Germaine Vallier. The film was remade in 1930.

Cast
 Jean Dax as Clavel de Larroque 
 Suzanne Munte as Duchesse de Diernstein  
 Germaine Vallier as Lucienne Marchal  
 Jean Peyrière as Jean Hiénard  
 Maurice Thorèze as Roger Brémont  
 Olga Noël as Juliette  
 Claire Prémore as Clémence Herbillon  
 Jacqueline Arly as Fanny  
 Léon Lorin as Amoretti  
 Jules de Spoly as Devienne  
 Madame de Wardemer as Madame de Sauvelys  
 Martin as Herbillon  
 Pierre Batcheff
 Maggy Delval as Mélanie Lascart  
 Louis Mafer as Frégose

References

Bibliography
 Goble, Alan. The Complete Index to Literary Sources in Film. Walter de Gruyter, 1999.

External links

1923 films
Films based on French novels
Films based on works by Georges Ohnet
Films directed by Maurice de Marsan
Films directed by Charles Maudru
French silent films
Films set in Paris
French black-and-white films
1920s French films